Ethmia leucocirrha is a moth in the family Depressariidae. It is found in South Africa.

The forewings are light ochreous-yellow overlaid with white and with small black dots beneath the costa near the base and at one-fourth. The stigmata is small and black, with the plical obliquely beyond the first discal, a similar dot is found midway between the plical and the base and the second discal is larger. The hindwings are pale yellowish overlaid with white.

References

Endemic moths of South Africa
Moths described in 1926
leucocirrha
Moths of Africa